Frederick Apartments is a well preserved Classical Revival-style apartment building in downtown Columbia, Missouri, across the street from the University of Missouri. Constructed in 1928 with 39 apartments the building has functioned as originally intended since that time. The building was listed on the National Register of Historic Places in 2013 under architectural criteria. It remains one of the largest early twentieth century apartment buildings in Columbia and one of only four remaining in the vicinity. The building is a memorial to Frederick Niedermeyer, Jr., a World War I pilot who perished in a plane crash. As of 2013, the owners are in the process of restoring the building.

It was designed by architect David Frederick Wallace, who also designed the Jackson County Courthouse in Independence.

References

Residential buildings on the National Register of Historic Places in Missouri
Neoclassical architecture in Missouri
Residential buildings completed in 1928
Apartment buildings in Columbia, Missouri
National Register of Historic Places in Boone County, Missouri